Ghada Owais (Arabic: غادة كرم عويس Ghāda Karam ‘Owais) is a Lebanese journalist for Al Jazeera. She was born on November 6, 1977, and attended the Lebanese University, graduating in 1999. Owais joined Al Jazeera in 2006. She speaks Arabic and English.

References

Al Jazeera people
Living people
1977 births
Lebanese University alumni